Võta või jäta is the Estonian version of the gameshow Deal or No Deal, airing on Viasat's TV3 channel since 2007. Estonia is the first of the three Baltic States to obtain a version of the television program.

The host is Alari Kivisaar. The prizes originally went from as little as 10 senti (about €0.006 or $0.01) to as big as 250,000 Estonian krooni (about €16,000 or $21,000), but the money tree was changed in August 2007 and the prizes went from 1 sent (about €0.0006 or $0.001) to 1,000,000 krooni (about €63,900 or $85,000). The set is very similar to the US counterpart.

A new series was started on 8 March 2013 and is also hosted by Alari Kivisaar. The top prize is €100,000.

Amount table

2007

2007–2010

NBC Around The World
<div style="float:left; width:250px;">

2013

Deal or No Deal USA visits Estonia
The US version of Deal or No Deal visited Estonia in early 2008, to tape a special episode as part of the show's ongoing World Tour. In this special edition, the show's studio, host and models are used; however, the on-screen graphics and audio cues were the American version's, added in the United States during post-production. Also, the game was played by American rules, using American money and contestants. Alari Kivisaar joined US host Howie Mandel as co-host. This special episode aired on the American NBC network on 7 May 2008. This stop was the first to be taped, but the Philippine stop was the first to air.
It is unknown if TV3 will be airing this special episode.

References

Deal or No Deal
2000s Estonian television series
2010s Estonian television series
2007 Estonian television series debuts
2013 Estonian television series debuts
TV3 (Estonia) original programming